Sir Michael Cathel Fallon  (born 14 May 1952) is a British politician who served as Secretary of State for Defence from 2014 to 2017. A member of the Conservative Party, he served as Member of Parliament (MP) for Sevenoaks from 1997 to 2019, having previously served as MP for Darlington from 1983 to 1992.

Fallon attended the independent Epsom College and read Classics and Ancient History at the University of St Andrews. After university he joined the Conservative Research Department. Elected for Darlington at the 1983 general election, he was appointed Parliamentary Under-Secretary of State at the Department for Education and Science in 1990. He lost his seat as MP for Darlington at the 1992 general election.

Fallon re-entered Parliament at the 1997 general election as MP for Sevenoaks. He served as Deputy Chairman of the Conservative Party from 2010 to 2012, Minister of State for Business and Enterprise from 2012 to 2014, Minister of State at the Department of Energy and Climate Change from 2013 to 2014 and Minister for Portsmouth in 2014. In the 2014 cabinet reshuffle he was promoted to Secretary of State for Defence. He resigned from the post after being implicated in the 2017 Westminster sexual misconduct allegations.

Early life and career
Fallon was born in Perth, Scotland. His father was an Irish-born surgeon, Dr Martin Fallon, who was educated in Dublin and became a high-ranking medical officer in the British Army. Dr Fallon received the OBE for services to the wounded including at Arnhem. Michael Fallon was educated at Craigflower Preparatory School near Dunfermline and at Epsom College, a private boys' school in Surrey. He then read Classics and Ancient History at the University of St Andrews, graduating in 1974 with a Master of Arts (MA Hons) degree.

As a student, Fallon was active in the European Movement and the "Yes" youth campaign in the 1975 referendum. After university he joined the Conservative Research Department, working first for Lord Carrington in the House of Lords until 1977 and then as European Desk Officer until 1979. He became Research Assistant to Baroness Elles in 1979, around the time that she became an MEP.

Parliamentary career
He was selected as the Conservative parliamentary candidate for Darlington in July 1982, and fought the Darlington by-election on 24 March 1983, which was held after the Labour MP Ted Fletcher had died. Although Fallon lost to Labour's Ossie O'Brien by 2,412 votes, he defeated O'Brien 77 days later by 3,438 votes in the 1983 general election.

Fallon was appointed as the Parliamentary Private Secretary to the Secretary of State for Energy Cecil Parkinson following the 1987 general election, and in 1988 joined the government of Margaret Thatcher as an Assistant Whip, becoming a Lord Commissioner to the Treasury in 1990. Fallon, alongside Michael Portillo and Michael Forsyth, visited Thatcher on the eve of her resignation in a last-ditch and ultimately unsuccessful attempt to persuade her to reconsider her decision.

Junior minister in the Department for Education and Science
Thatcher appointed Fallon Parliamentary Under Secretary of State for the Department for Education and Science in July 1990, a position he continued to hold under the new premiership of John Major. In this office Fallon headed legislation that led to the local management of schools, which among other changes gave schools a greater degree of financial independence, including control of their own bank accounts and cheque books. He remained in that office until the 1992 general election, when he lost his seat at Darlington to Labour's Alan Milburn by a margin of 2,798 votes.

Return to the House of Commons
Fallon was selected to stand in the safe Conservative seat of Sevenoaks, after  the sitting member, Mark Wolfson, decided not to stand again at the 1997 general election. At that election he held Sevenoaks with a substantially reduced majority.

Soon after his return to parliament, Fallon was appointed by William Hague as Opposition Spokesman for Trade and Industry and then as Shadow Financial Secretary to the Treasury, but in October 1998 he resigned from the front bench, owing to ill health, remaining on the backbenches until Hague appointed him as Deputy Chairman of the Conservative Party.

From 1999 he was a member of the Treasury Select Committee and chairman of its Sub-Committee (2001–10). He also served on the executive committee of the 1922 Committee between 2005 and 2007.

In September 2012, David Cameron appointed Fallon as Minister for Business and Enterprise and he also became a Privy Councillor.

Fallon has been a director at Tullett Prebon, a leading brokerage firm in the City of London, and was one of the biggest supporters of the privatisation of the Royal Mail.

In January 2014, Fallon was appointed as Minister for Portsmouth. Six months later, on 15 July 2014, Cameron promoted him to the Cabinet, as Secretary of State for Defence.

Secretary of State for Defence (2014–2017)

In February 2016, the week after a leaked United Nations report had found the Saudi-led coalition guilty of conducting "widespread and systematic" air strikes against civilians in Yemen – including camps for internally displaced people, weddings, schools, hospitals, religious centers, vehicles and markets – and the same day the International Development Select Committee had said that the UK should end all arms exports to Saudi Arabia because of ongoing, large-scale human rights violations by the Kingdom's armed forces in Yemen, Fallon was criticised for attending a £450-a-head dinner for an arms-industry trade-body.

In December 2016, Fallon admitted that UK-supplied internationally banned cluster munitions had been used in Saudi Arabia's bombing campaign in Yemen.

In April 2017, Fallon confirmed that the UK would use its nuclear weapons in a "pre-emptive initial strike" in "the most extreme circumstances" on BBC Radio's Today programme.

In 2017, Fallon warned that Russia's Zapad 2017 exercise in Belarus and Russia's Kaliningrad Oblast was "designed to provoke us". Fallon falsely claimed that number of Russian troops taking part in exercise could reach 100,000.

European Union
In an interview in The Daily Telegraph in 2016, before the European Union (EU) membership referendum, Fallon described himself as Eurosceptic and critical of many aspects of the EU, but said that he wanted Britain to remain in the EU, in the face of multiple threats from Russia's president Vladimir Putin, crime, and international terrorism.

Run-up to the 2015 general election
During the run-up to the 2015 general election, Fallon wrote an article in The Times saying that Ed Miliband had stabbed his brother David Miliband in the back to become Labour leader and he would also stab Britain in the back to become prime minister. Fallon subsequently declined the opportunity to describe Miliband as a decent person and his comments embarrassed some Conservative supporters. Miliband gave a response, saying that Fallon had fallen below his usual standards and demeaned himself, which the New Statesman asserted was dignified, contrasting with Fallon's counter-productive personal attack.

Expenses scandal
According to The Daily Telegraph Fallon, Deputy Chairman of the Treasury Select Committee, claimed for mortgage repayments on his Westminster flat in their entirety. MPs are only allowed to claim for interest charges.

Between 2002 and 2004, Fallon regularly claimed £1,255 per month in capital repayments and interest, rather than the £700–£800 for the interest component alone. After his error was noticed by staff at the Commons Fees Office in September 2004, he asked: "Why has no one brought this to my attention before?"  He repaid £2,200 of this over-claim, but was allowed to offset the remaining £6,100 against his allowance. After realising they had failed to notice the excessive claims, Commons staff reportedly suggested Fallon submit fresh claims which would "reassign" the surplus payments to other costs he had legitimately incurred.

Allegations of sexual harassment, inappropriate behaviour and resignation
In late October 2017 it was reported that Fallon had repeatedly and inappropriately touched journalist Julia Hartley-Brewer's knee during a dinner in 2002. Hartley-Brewer recalled that after Fallon kept putting his hand on her knee, she "calmly and politely explained to him, that if he did it again, I would punch him in the face". Fallon resigned two days later believing his "previous conduct" towards women had "fallen below" what is acceptable. Hartley-Brewer expressed shock at the resignation, saying: "I didn't feel it was something that needed any further dealing with".

It was subsequently reported Fallon had been forced to resign in part due to an allegation of inappropriate and lewd comments towards fellow Conservative MP Andrea Leadsom when they both sat on the Treasury Select Committee. He was also accused of making comments of a sexual nature about other MPs on the committee and members of the public who attended hearings. The former political editor of The Independent on Sunday, Jane Merrick, said in The Observer in early November 2017 that Fallon was the previously unnamed Conservative MP who had "lunged" at her a decade and a half earlier. She had contacted Downing Street about the incident several hours before he resigned. The Observer reported on the same day that "the revelation was the tipping point for No 10, which ... had been compiling a list of alleged incidents involving Fallon since claims against him were first made."

In September 2019, Fallon announced he would not seek re-election at the 2019 United Kingdom general election.

Career outside Parliament
Between 1992 and 1997, Fallon set up a chain of children's nurseries called Just Learning with funding from the British Dragons' Den member Duncan Bannatyne, becoming chief executive.

Personal life
Fallon has been married to Wendy Elisabeth Payne, a HR professional, since 27 September 1986; the couple have two sons. The family lives in Sundridge, Kent.

He was banned from driving for 18 months in 1983 after admitting a drink-driving offence during the general election campaign.

Fallon was made a Knight Commander of the Order of the Bath (KCB) for political and public service as part of the Resignation Honours of the outgoing prime minister David Cameron.

Publications
The Quango Explosion: Public Bodies and Ministerial Patronage by Philip Holland and Michael Fallon, 1978, Conservative Political Centre, 
Sovereign Members by Michael Fallon, 1982
The Rise of the Euroquango by Michael Fallon, 1982, Adam Smith Institute, 
Brighter Schools: Attracting Private Investment into State Schools by Michael Fallon, 1993, Social Market Foundation,

References

External links

Michael Fallon website

Debrett's People of Today
Guardian Unlimited Politics – Ask Aristotle: Michael Fallon MP

|-

|-

|-

|-

|-

|-

|-

1952 births
Living people
Alumni of the University of St Andrews
British Secretaries of State
Conservative Party (UK) MPs for English constituencies
Knights Commander of the Order of the Bath
Members of the Privy Council of the United Kingdom
People educated at Craigflower Preparatory School
People educated at Epsom College
People from Perth, Scotland
Secretaries of State for Defence (UK)
UK MPs 1983–1987
UK MPs 1987–1992
UK MPs 1997–2001
UK MPs 2001–2005
UK MPs 2005–2010
UK MPs 2010–2015
UK MPs 2015–2017
UK MPs 2017–2019
Politicians awarded knighthoods
People from Sundridge, Kent